Starhorse Shipping Lines, Inc. is a domestic shipping company based in Lucena City, Quezon, Philippines. It was established in 2008 by entrepreneur and politician Victor Reyes, who was a former board member in Quezon Province. It mainly serves the provinces of Marinduque, Masbate, Quezon, and Romblon and is one of the leading domestic shipping companies operating in the Calabarzon, Bicol, Visayas, and Mimaropa regions.

History
Starhorse Shipping Lines, Inc. (SSLI) was established in 2008 by entrepreneur and Quezon Province provincial board member Victor A. Reyes, who was previously the President of the defunct domestic shipping company Viva Shipping Lines, Inc. in the 1990s. SSLI is now being managed by Victor Reyes' wife, Merian Hernandez-Reyes, following Reyes' death in 2016.

The company acquired two RORO ferries leased from the state-owned DBP Leasing Corporation and operated them initially in the Lucena City-Marinduque route. In the succeeding years, the Maritime Industry Authority eventually allowed the company to operate in other routes aside from the Lucena-Marinduque and Lucena-Marinduque-Romblon route. In 2018, the company commissioned the construction of two new vessels in Mokpo, South Korea, allowing it to operate additional routes such as the San Andres, Quezon-Pasacao, Camarines Sur-San Pascual, Masbate route. 

In 2020, during the COVID-19 pandemic in the Philippines, the company was one of several ferry companies that assisted the Philippine government in helping locally stranded individuals return to their provinces.

Routes
As of January 2021, Starhorse Shipping Lines operates on the following routes:

Fleet
Starhorse Shipping Lines operates twelve RORO vessels as of April 2022. Some of these vessels were leased from DBP Leasing Corporation, while three were built by Moon-chang Shipbuilding Dockyard in Mokpo, South Korea:

 MV Virgen de Peñafrancia II
 MV Virgen de Peñafrancia V
 MV Virgen de Peñafrancia VII
 MV Virgen de Peñafrancia VIII 
 MV Virgen de Peñafrancia IX
 MV Virgen de Peñafrancia X
 MV Virgen de Peñafrancia XI

References

External links
Starhorse Shipping Lines on Facebook

 Ferries of the Philippines
 Ferry companies of the Philippines
 Passenger ships of the Philippines
 Shipping companies of the Philippines
 Companies based in Quezon